Kamel Guerri (born 6 June 1968) is an Algerian alpine skier. He competed in two events at the 1992 Winter Olympics.

References

External links
 

1968 births
Living people
Algerian male alpine skiers
Olympic alpine skiers of Algeria
Alpine skiers at the 1992 Winter Olympics
Place of birth missing (living people)
21st-century Algerian people